This is a list of members of the Australian House of Representatives from 2001 to 2004, as elected at the 2001 federal election.

 The Labor member for the Wollongong-based seat of Cunningham, Stephen Martin, resigned on 16 August 2002; the Australian Greens candidate Michael Organ won the resulting by-election on 19 October.

References

Members of Australian parliaments by term
21st-century Australian politicians